Yallammawadi is a village in Belgaum district, within the southern state of Karnataka, India.

References

Villages in Belagavi district